The 2017 French Road Cycling Cup was the 26th edition of the French Road Cycling Cup. Compared to the previous season, the same 16 events were part of the cup with the exception of Cholet-Pays de Loire, which was not held due to a dispute between the race organiser and the mayor of Cholet. The defending champion from the previous season was Samuel Dumoulin.

The 2017 edition was won by Laurent Pichon, who took the lead already after the second event and kept it until the end.

Events

Race results

Grand Prix d'Ouverture La Marseillaise

Classic Loire Atlantique

Route Adélie

La Roue Tourangelle

Paris–Camembert

Grand Prix de Denain

Tour du Finistère

Tro-Bro Léon

Grand Prix de Plumelec-Morbihan

Boucles de l'Aulne

Polynormande

Grand Prix de Fourmies

Tour du Doubs

Grand Prix d'Isbergues

Tour de Vendée

Final cup standings

Individual
All competing riders are eligible for this classification, not only those that are French or compete for a French-licensed team as was the case until 2015.

Young rider classification
All riders younger than 25 are eligible for this classification, not only those that are French or compete for a French-licensed team as was the case until 2015.

Teams
Only French teams are eligible to be classified in the teams classification.

Notes

References

External links
  

French Road Cycling Cup
French Road Cycling Cup
Road Cycling